Bedo Aeddren (fl. c. 1500) was a Welsh language poet from the area that is now Denbighshire, north-east Wales.

Bedo composed poems on themes of love and nature in the tradition of Dafydd ap Gwilym and other cywyddwyr.

References
Gwyn Williams, "The Burning Tree: Poems from the First Thousand Years of Welsh Verse" (Faber and Faber, 1956).

16th-century Welsh poets
Welsh-language poets
Year of death unknown
Year of birth unknown